Tipsport Arena may refer to:
Tipsport Arena (Prague), located in Prague, Czech Republic, home to HC Sparta Praha ice hockey team
Tipsport Arena (Liberec), located in Liberec, Czech Republic, home to HC Bílí Tygři Liberec ice hockey team